Sarfaraz Ahmed Bugti is a Pakistani politician who was a Member of the Provincial Assembly of Balochistan, from May 2013 to May 2018.

Early life and education
He was born on 1 June 1980 in Dera Bugti District.

He has done graduation.

Political career

He was elected to the Provincial Assembly of Balochistan as a candidate of Pakistan Muslim League (N) from Constituency PB-24 Dera Bugti in 2013 Pakistani general election.

References

Living people
Balochistan MPAs 2013–2018
1980 births
Pakistan Muslim League (N) politicians